Răzvan Popa may refer to:

Răzvan Popa (footballer) (born 1997), Romanian footballer
Răzvan Popa (politician) (born 1978), Romanian politician